Outposts: Journeys to the surviving relics of the British Empire is a book by Simon Winchester. It details his travels to each of the remaining dependencies of the British Empire and was first published in 1985 in Britain by Hodder and Stoughton under the title Outposts and in the United States by Prentice Hall as The Sun Never Sets: Travels to the Remaining Outposts of the British Empire. It was reprinted in 2003 with a new foreword written to address the changing political climate and attitudes in relation to the British Empire, most importantly concerning the handover of Hong Kong to China and, more generally, the rise of globalism.

Publication history
Outposts: Journeys to the Surviving Relics of the British Empire (1985), Hodder & Stoughton
The Sun Never Sets: Travels to the Remaining Outposts of the British Empire (1985), Prentice Hall
Outposts: Journeys to the Surviving Relics of the British Empire revised ed. (2003), Penguin

References

Books by Simon Winchester
British Overseas Territories
1985 non-fiction books
British travel books
Books about the British Empire
Books about foreign relations of the United Kingdom
English non-fiction books